Ballew is a surname. Notable people with the surname include:

Brady Ballew (born 1992), American soccer player
Chris Ballew (born 1965), American musician
Smith Ballew (1902–1984), American actor and singer

See also
Ken Ballew raid
Ballew v. Georgia, a United States Supreme Court case